Chris Smiley (born 6 April 1992) is a British racing driver. He is a British Touring Car Championship race winner and the current TCR UK Touring Car Championship champion.

Racing career

Early career
Smiley began his career in karting in 2000 he finished 3rd overall in the BRDC Stars Of Tomorrow in 2006, he also raced in the Ginetta Junior Championship after winning the junior scholarship in 2007. He went on to win the 2013 Mini Challenge GB title, scoring 9 wins and 14 podiums in 20 races. He made a one-off appearance in the 2014 Volkswagen Racing Cup winning both races at Oulton Park Circuit , as well as finishing 4th in the Volkswagen Scirocco R-Cup in 2014.

British Touring Car Championship
In January 2016, it was announced that Smiley would make his British Touring Car Championship debut with TLC Racing driving a Toyota Avensis. However, he was forced to leave the championship at the mid-way point due to funding issues. He would end up 32nd in the standings with a best result of 16th at Thruxton. For the second half of the 2016 season he joined the Renault UK Clio Cup and achieved a best result of 5th at Rockingham and finished the season in 17th position scoring 92 points.

Smiley returned to the BTCC in 2017 with BTC Norlin Racing where he would stay for the next 3 seasons. The relationship proved fruitful with Smiley scoring a debut win at Rockingham in 2018 alongside a further 4 podiums. His best season was 2018 where he finished 13th and scored 132 points.

For 2020 Smiley joined Excelr8 Motorsport and the brand new Hyundai i30 Fastback project. In the season opener at Donington Park Smiley secured a first ever podium for Hyundai in the championship on the cars debut. He finished the season in 14th with 106 points. He was retained by the team for 2021 but endured a tougher season, finishing 15th with a best result of 4th.

TCR UK Touring Car Championship
Having been left without a BTCC drive, Smiley joined the 2022 TCR UK Touring Car Championship grid driving a Honda Civic Type R TCR (FK8). He re-joined his former BTC Racing team boss, Bert Taylor, at the newly formed Restart Racing. In the opening race at Oulton Park Smiley completed a grand chelem by taking pole position, fastest lap and leading every lap on his way to victory. In the reverse grid second race of the day he managed to fight his way up to 5th and left the opening round 2nd in the championship behind Max Hart.

In the second event Smiley once again qualified on pole but contact with Adam Shepherd in the Hyundai sent him tumbling down the order. He recovered to 14th after a pit-stop. In the reverse grid race he fought his way through to second but fell 44 points behind after Max Hart's double victory.

Round 3 took place at Brands Hatch and was a triple header. The weekend started well for Smiley with a 2nd place in the opening encounter but a mechanical failure in the reverse grid race and an 8th place finish in the third race dropped him to fourth in the championship behind Isaac Smith and reigning double champion Lewis Kent.

The championship returned to Oulton Park for Round 4 but Smiley was unable to reproduce his race winning form the opening event taking 2 4th places which lifted him back up to 3rd in the championship.

Round 5 took place at Castle Combe and Smiley returned to form by taking pole position. However a clutch issue at the start of the opener led to him stalling on the grid when the lights went out. He managed to battle his way back through the pack to 5th position and secured an additional point for fastest lap. In the second race Smiley was forced to start from the pit-lane due to the same clutch issue that hindered him in the first race. Again he picked his way back through the field to finish 4th and took fastest lap. Due to issues for Lewis Kent and Max Hart, Smiley was able to pull himself back up to second in the championship behind Isaac Smith.

The penultimate event saw the championship return to Donington Park with Smiley qualifying 2nd for the opening encounter but he fell back to 3rd by the end of the race. However in the second race contact between Jamie Tonks and Adam Shepherd caused Shepherd's Hyundai to hit Smiley's Honda breaking the right rear suspension and forcing him out of the race. Due to the championship's drop score system however Smiley found himself leading the championship, albeit equal on points with Smith.

The season finale took place at Snetterton after an almost 2 month break. In wet conditions Smiley took pole by just over a second and took his second victory of the season in the first race. However, with Smith finishing behind him, and also taking the point for fastest lap, Smiley could only extend his advantage to 8 points. In the final race of the season Smiley and Smith battled on track with Smith eventually succumbing to the pressure, running wide, and handing the championship to Smiley with a margin of 21 points.

Racing record

Complete British Touring Car Championship results
(key) (Races in bold indicate pole position – 1 point awarded just in first race; races in italics indicate fastest lap – 1 point awarded all races; * signifies that driver led race for at least one lap – 1 point given all races)

References

External links
 Chris Smiley Official Website
 
 
 

1992 births
Living people
British Touring Car Championship drivers
Racing drivers from Northern Ireland
British racing drivers
Ginetta Junior Championship drivers
Renault UK Clio Cup drivers
Mini Challenge UK drivers
FIA Motorsport Games drivers